Višinskis is a Lithuanian family name. It  may refer to:

Povilas Višinskis, a Lithuanian writer, journalist, theatre director, and politician
Rasmutis Višinskis, a Soviet Lithuanian 1980 Olympic canoer

Lithuanian-language surnames
lt:Višinskis